Frank Hursley (November 21, 1902 – February 3, 1989) was an American soap opera writer.

Career
He was a writer on the Western series Have Gun, Will Travel, but became famous in 1957 when he began writing for CBS Daytime's Search for Tomorrow. He continued to write for the show even after another soap opera that he co-created with his wife, General Hospital had premiered. Another married couple of television writer, Theodore and Mathilde Ferro, wrote the show in its early months.

They created the medical drama General Hospital, for ABC Daytime in 1963; it was the first serious effort by that network to create a daytime serial. Today, General Hospital is the longest-running daytime serial on ABC. The duo head wrote the show until 1973, when they handed the reins to their daughter and son-in-law, Bridget and Jerome Dobson.

In 1969, the Hursleys created and wrote the NBC Daytime soap opera Bright Promise that starred Dana Andrews as college president Tom Boswell. However, they soon left that series and it was eventually cancelled in 1972. The Hursleys retired from writing serials after being fired in 1973.

Lawsuit
His estate filed a lawsuit against Disney in April 2011 over unpaid wages. According to the lawsuit, the Hursleys' daughters claimed their parents struck a deal with ABC years earlier to reap 10% of all profits from the syndication of the show, but ABC hadn't honored the deal. The daughters alleged ABC failed to pay the full amount owed to the creators.

Credits
Love, American Style, Wagon Train, Have Gun – Will Travel, Whirlybirds, The Adventures of Jim Bowie, The Millionaire, Dr. Christian, Lassie, Matinee Theatre, The 20th Century-Fox Hour, The Moon is Blue

Awards/nominations
He was nominated for a Daytime Emmy Awards in 1974. He shared this nomination with his wife, daughter, and Deborah Hardy.

Personal life
Hursley was a graduate of the University of Michigan (A.B. 1925). His father-in-law was Socialist Congressman Victor Berger and held a law degree from Marquette University. Hursley left his first wife, Madeleine, and their one-year-old son, Frank Jr., both of Detroit and became an English professor at the University of Wisconsin's Milwaukee Extension.

After Doris's divorce in 1935 from her first husband, Colin Welles, she married Frank in 1936. The couple began writing for radio during World War II and moved from their home in Thiensville, Wisconsin to California in 1946.

Their daughter Bridget also became a television writer, creating Santa Barbara.

References

External links
 "The Real-Life Soap Opera of GENERAL HOSPITAL Creator, Frank Hursley"
Frank and Doris Hursley Papers at the University of Wyoming - American Heritage Center

University of Michigan alumni
American soap opera writers
1902 births
1989 deaths
People from Thiensville, Wisconsin
Screenwriters from Wisconsin
20th-century American screenwriters